The Outpost (internationally also known as The Section) is a 1995 Hungarian drama film directed by Péter Gothár. It was screened in the Un Certain Regard section at the 1995 Cannes Film Festival. The film was selected as the Hungarian entry for the Best Foreign Language Film at the 68th Academy Awards, but was not accepted as a nominee.

Cast
 Mari Nagy as Gizella Weisz
 József Szarvas as Öcsi, or Petya
 Valentin Teodosiu
 Misu Dimvale
 Andrei Finti
 Géza Tóth as Jani Kupter
 Alexandru Bindea as Colleague
 Stefan Sileanu as Onaga
 Marcel Marcu as Chauffeur
 Gheorghe Visu
 Radu Nicoara
 Monica Ghiuta
 Sándor Karácsony
 Ovidiu Ghinita
 Iván Dengyel
 Mari Törőcsik as Narrator (voice)

See also
 List of submissions to the 68th Academy Awards for Best Foreign Language Film
 List of Hungarian submissions for the Academy Award for Best Foreign Language Film

References

External links

1995 films
Hungarian drama films
1990s Hungarian-language films
1995 drama films
Films directed by Péter Gothár
Films based on Hungarian novels
Films shot in Bulgaria